Oksana Shkurat (born 30 July 1993) is a Ukrainian hurdler. She competed at the 2016 Summer Olympics in the women's 100 metres hurdles race; her time of 13.22 seconds in the heats did not qualify her for the semifinals.

References

1993 births
Living people
Sportspeople from Sumy
Ukrainian female hurdlers
Olympic athletes of Ukraine
Athletes (track and field) at the 2016 Summer Olympics